Hele's School, formerly Plympton Grammar School, is a mixed  Academy school and Sixth Form in the Plympton district of Plymouth, England,  east of Plymouth city centre. Until 31 March 2011, Hele’s was a community school funded by the Local Education Authority (LEA), which is Plymouth City Council. From 1 April 2011, Hele's became an Academy, which among other things gives the school financial and educational independence. The school has a voluntary Combined Cadet Force with Navy, Army and RAF sections. Cadets in the CCF are given the option to take part in the annual Ten Tors Challenge on Dartmoor.

Admissions
In September 2000, the Department for Education and Skills (DfES) designated the school as a specialist Language College. The school has also been designated as a Mathematics and Computing College and has also taken on applied learning specialism.

Academy status
In June 2010, the government wrote to all schools that had been judged as 'outstanding' by Ofsted, inviting their Governing Bodies to consider converting to Academy status. The Governors of Hele's School consulted with parents and unanimously voted to apply to become an Academy, effective from 1 April 2011.

History

Hele's (pronounced "heals") School was founded as "Plympton Grammar School" in 1658 under a bequest made in the will of the lawyer Elize Hele (1560–1635) of Fardel in the parish of Cornwood, and of Parke in the parish of Bovey Tracey, both in Devon. The school was renamed after him as "Hele's School" when it became a  state comprehensive in 1985. Hele's bequest was overseen by Sir John Maynard and also led to the founding of The Maynard School and Hele's School, Exeter. In 1715 the Reverend Samuel Reynolds was appointed as head master and his son the painter Sir Joshua Reynolds (1723-1792) attended the school. The original building, a grade II* listed building, survives in George Lane, Castle Barbican, in Plympton St. Maurice, but in 1937 the school moved to new premises on Seymour Road, which it still occupies today.  The school maintains an association with the Plympton Grammar School Old Boys field hockey club, formed in 1926.

Prime Minister's Global Fellowship
Students have attained places on the  Prime Minister's Global Fellowship programme. The school achieved its first student in the inaugural year of the programme, 2008, and in 2009 had another successful applicant.

Notable former pupils

Plympton Grammar School (1658–1983)
 Charles Eastlake, painter
 Kevin Foster, Conservative MP
 Benjamin Haydon, painter and writer
 Patricia Hollis, politician
 James Northcote, painter
 Charles Morice Pole, naval officer and politician
 Sir Joshua Reynolds, painter
 Samuel Rowe, topographer
 Parson John "Jack" Russell, clergyman, sportsman and dog breeder
 Sir Gordon Shattock, Conservative Party's Western-area Chairman, who survived the 1984 Brighton bombing
 Harry Trelawny, dissenting minister, Church of England clergyman, and Roman Catholic priest
 John Parker, 1st Earl of Morley (1772-1840) of nearby Saltram House.

References

External links
 

Educational institutions established in the 1650s
1658 establishments in England
Secondary schools in Plymouth, Devon
Academies in Plymouth, Devon